Dolichoderus longipennis is an extinct species of Eocene ant in the genus Dolichoderus. Described by Mayr in 1868, the fossils were discovered in the Baltic Amber.

References

†
Prehistoric insects of Europe
Fossil taxa described in 1868
Fossil ant taxa